"Mizérable" is the debut mini album of Japanese singer-songwriter Gackt, released on May 12, 1999, by Nippon Crown. It marked his solo debut, four months after he left Malice Mizer. The album still remains as one of Gackt's best selling albums.

Summary
In 1999, the 26-year-old Gackt was living in Tokyo, and trying to set up his solo project. He was joined by his fellow Cains:Feel members, You Kurosaki who became the rhythmic guitarist and violinist and Ren Aoba who became the bassist of his live supporting band, also the other, not-known members. Of them only Masa Shinozaki continued to be part of the support band. In February, Gackt travelled in Los Angeles, U.S. and France, to complete recording and filming. In April, he held his first concerts in 10 months called Gackt Easter Live - Resurrection, which was held in the Omiya Arche. It was a small event where he performed the song "Mizerable" live for the first time, as well talked with fans and announced the upcoming national tour.

The song "Mizerable"  being the title song from the mini-album, was released one month later. This was first released as a single box containing a mini CD with the song and instrumental track, along VHS of the title song's promotional video and making of. Also nine days later a mini CD single version was released, containing no VHS. Also the song "Story" was re-recorded and released as a single titled "Saikai ~Story~" on August 30, 2000. Both songs were included on the 2004 compilation, The Sixth Day: Single Collection.

Release
The album was released on May 12, 1999, by Nippon Crown. In the fourth counting week of May it reached number two on the Oricon chart, with sales of 163,970 copies. In the upcoming week, it was at number ten respectively, with sales of 28,380 copies. It charted for 12 weeks, and with sales of 252,670 copies, it was the 95th best selling album of the year.

From the album were released two singles, "Mizérable", and a re-recording of "Story" titled "Saikai ~Story~", but is not considered the album's official single. The first single "Mizérable" reached number three on the second counting week of July, with sales of 65,530 copies. In the upcoming week, it was at number fifteen, with sales of 20,230 copies. It charted for 9 weeks, and sold over 116,771 copies. The second single "Saikai ~Story~" reached number seven on the second counting week of September 2000, with sales of 60,510 copies. It charted for 6 weeks, and sold over 91,200 copies.

Track listing

Album credits

Personnel
Vocals: Gackt Camui
Guitars: You Kurosaki, Hideki Ekawa, Masa Shinozaki, Ren Aoba, Nao
Bass guitar: Ren Aoba, Chuck Wright
Drums: Matt Sorum, Gackt Camui
Piano: Gackt Camui
Violin solo: Bruce Dukov
Cello solo: Dennis Karamazyan
Keyboards: Yohei Shimada, Gackt Camui
Voice over: Val'erie Blier

Production
Producer: Gackt
Executive producer: Atsushi Takeshi, Masami Kudo (Nippon Crown)
Engineer: Stan Katayama, Tetsuo Mori, Hiroto Kobayashi, John Aguto, Brian Kinkel
String engineer: Nicholas Pike
Mixing: Stan Katayama
Programming: Takashi Furukawa, Yohei Shimada

Design
Art direction: Yoichirou Fujii (Bakery37.1)
Design: Maki Yoshikawa, Keiko Shimamura (Bakery37.1)
Photography: William Hames, Bruce Ecker

References

1999 EPs
Gackt albums